(born 16 July 1941) is a Japanese film director.

Career
Born in Gifu Prefecture, Kōyama attended Nihon University but quit midway to join the independent production company Kindai Eiga Kyokai, where he worked as an assistant director under such directors as Kaneto Shindō, Kōzaburō Yoshimura, and Tadashi Imai. He made his directorial debut in 1971 with the children's film Koi no iru mura. His second film, Futatsu no hāmonika (1976), earned him a New Directors Citation from the Directors Guild of Japan. His 1983 film Hometown was entered into the 13th Moscow International Film Festival. His 1987 film, Hachiko Monogatari, about the faithful dog Hachikō, was the top Japanese film at the box office that year. He is known for his humanistic perspective.

Kōyama was given the Chūnichi Culture Award in 2000 for "producing films that scrutinize the age and the region."

Selected filmography
 Koi no iru mura (鯉のいる村) (1971)
 Futatsu no hāmonika (二つのハーモニカ) (1976)
 Hometown (1983)
 Hachiko Monogatari (ハチ公物語) (1987)
 Tōki Rakujitsu (遠き落日) (1992)
 Toki no Kōro (時の行路) (2019)

References

External links
 
 

Japanese film directors
1941 births
Living people
People from Gifu Prefecture
Nihon University alumni